Genaro Alberto Olivieri (born 4 August 1998) is an Argentine tennis player.

Olivieri has a career high ATP singles ranking of 190 achieved on 21 November 2022. He also has a career high doubles ranking of 304 achieved on 29 August 2022.

Career finals

Singles: 12 (4–8)

Doubles: 9 (4–5)

Personal life
Olivieri started playing tennis at the age of 6, splitting practice time with association football. He is a supporter of Boca Juniors.

References

External links
 
 

1998 births
Living people
Argentine male tennis players
Sportspeople from Buenos Aires Province
21st-century Argentine people